Cristian Devallis (born August 25, 1983 in Rio Segundo, Argentina) is an Argentine footballer.

Club career

Cristian Javier Devallis firstly played for Talleres de Córdoba. In 2004, he moved to Almagro. In 2005, he returned to Talleres de Córdoba. Later, he moved to Gimnasia y Esgrima de Jujuy but one year later he returned again to Talleres de Córdoba. In 2007, he moved to Racing de Córdoba. In 2008, he moved to 9 de Julio de Rafaela and in 2009 to Santiago Wanderers. Later, he moved to Patronato de Paraná. In 2011, he moved to Boca Unidos.

Olympiakos Volou 1937 F.C.

In summer 2012 he moved to Olympiakos Volou 1937 F.C. In winter of the same year he was released by the club.

References
 
 

1983 births
Living people
Argentine footballers
Argentine expatriate footballers
Talleres de Córdoba footballers
Club Almagro players
Racing de Córdoba footballers
Gimnasia y Esgrima de Jujuy footballers
Club Atlético Patronato footballers
Santiago Wanderers footballers
Expatriate footballers in Chile
9 de Julio de Rafaela players
Association football midfielders
Sportspeople from Córdoba Province, Argentina